Javid Ehsani Shakib is an Iranian Paralympic athlete competing in discus throw and shot put events. He represented Iran at the 2016 Summer Paralympics held in Rio de Janeiro, Brazil and he won the bronze medal in the men's shot put F57 event.

Career 

He won the silver medal in the men's shot put F57 event at the 2017 Islamic Solidarity Games held in Baku, Azerbaijan.

He competed at the Asian Para Games on three occasions, winning a total of one gold medal and two silver medals. In 2010, he won the gold medal in the men's discus throw F57 event. In 2014, he won the silver medal in the men's shot put F57 event and in 2018, he won the silver medal in the men's discus throw F57 event.

Achievements

References

External links 
 

Living people
Year of birth missing (living people)
Place of birth missing (living people)
Athletes (track and field) at the 2016 Summer Paralympics
Medalists at the 2016 Summer Paralympics
Paralympic bronze medalists for Iran
Paralympic medalists in athletics (track and field)
Paralympic athletes of Iran
Iranian male shot putters
Iranian male discus throwers
21st-century Iranian people